Suillus fuscotomentosus is an edible species of mushroom in the genus Suillus. Found in western North America, it was described as new to science in 1964 by mycologists Harry Delbert Thiers and Alexander H. Smith. It usually grows under three-needle pines, such as ponderosa pine and Monterey pine.

See also
List of North American boletes

References

External links

Edible fungi
Fungi of North America
Fungi described in 1964
fuscotomentosus